The Pancreas is an organ of animal bodies.

Pancreas may also refer to:
Pancreas divisum
Exocrine pancreas
Pancreas (song), by "Weird Al" Yankovic

See also 
St Pancras, London